The First Battle of Guinegate took place on 7 August 1479. French troops of King Louis XI were defeated by the Burgundians led by Archduke (later to be Emperor) Maximilian of Habsburg. This battle was the first in which the innovative Swiss pike square formation was employed by a power that was not natively Swiss.

Background 
Charles the Bold, the last Duke of Burgundy had been killed at the Battle of Nancy on 5 January 1477. King Louis XI immediately adjudicated his territories to be recovered fiefs of the French kingdom and campaigned in the counties of Artois, Flanders, Hainaut, and the Duchy of Burgundy. Nevertheless, Charles' only heir, Mary of Burgundy on 19 August, had married Archduke Maximilian, who, determined to protect the Burgundian inheritance, organized troops in the Netherlands and marched against the French army.

Many of the troops that had been victorious at the Battle of Nancy had been provided by the Lower League. Among these troops was a sizable contingent of Swiss soldiers that had been a part of the victorious army of Lorraine, and the salient characteristic of this contingent was their method of fighting. Formed up in pike squares, Swiss mercenaries made themselves and their method of warfare felt far beyond their borders. The notable characteristic of the pike squares is the difficulty with which the traditional cavalry of the day had in penetrating it.

The failure at Nancy, and its reasons, had not escaped Jacques of Savoy, Count of Romont, who had fought under the Archduke's father-in-law, Charles, at the Battle of Nancy. He was now fighting with the Archduke, and he urged him to adopt a similar method of fighting with his 11,000 foot troops. According to Delbruck, as the twenty-year-old Maximilian was still young, inexperienced and in the territories of his wife, it was Romont, the Swiss count who formed up the Flemish infantry in the Swiss manner. Also, in the same area, a formation similar to that of the Swiss had been used by Flemish rebels against the French knights successfully in the 1302 battle of Courtrai, although at Rosebeke in 1382, the combat method failed in the plain terrain (as opposed to the Swiss mountainous terrain). Jelle Haemers and Gerhard Benecke on the other hand note that the Duke did take personal control of military operations himself, like an impresario, although he did get help from advisors, especially regarding financial matters (which he also controlled during the time of war).

Prelude to battle 
Both sides met at the village of Guinegatte in the County of Artois, and armies gathered into formation. The cavalry was stationed on the flanks, and the infantry was positioned in the center. However, besides this the two sides diverged significantly in the character of their armies.

French dispositions 
The French, whose infantry consisted primarily of archers, positioned them between their cavalry, composed of gendarmes and coutiliers.

Burgundian dispositions 
The Archduke was employing Burgundians in his army, and had formed his infantry into two deep, large squares. One of these was commanded by the Count Engelbert of Nassau, who had also fought under the Archduke's father-in-law at Nancy. The other square was commanded by the Count of Romont.

Battle 

At the beginning of the battle, Lord des Cordes forced back the knights within the left infantry square and also captured the Burgundian artillery drawn up on that flank. The Burgundian left flank under the command of Nassau was in a perilous state. In addition to being attacked from the front, it was also drawing fire on its flank from the captured artillery. However, instead of following up their advantage on the left flank, the French knights on the left chased after the Burgundian knights who were fleeing from the field, thereby giving up their advantage. Meanwhile, on the other flank which were commanded by Maximilian and Romont, the Burgundians held fast and slowly fought their way forward against the French, who directed their efforts against the main line of the Burgundians and turned their artillery pieces against them. The momentum of the French was lost. After a long duration of indecisive fighting, the Burgundian side launched a counter-attack that forced the French to retreat at 8:00 p.m. towards Hesdin. The Burgundian knights rode back on the battlefield and took revenge on their French counterparts that fled the battlefield.

According to Delbruck, Maximilian did not fight with the knights but stood with his pikemen from the beginning. These nobles were positioned in the first ranks of the squares. The writings of de But and others make a point that the pikemen was the primary factor in the repulse of the French attack, with Maximilian's personal bravery playing a notable role (Delbruck opines that the flank protection accomplished by the knights on at least one side of the squares played a role as well). According to Verbruggen, the French strong cavalry at first repelled the Burgundian cavalry (which was consisted of 825 lances). Maximilian then dismounted together with 500 of his nobles. The nobles fought with the foot troops, provided the formation and leadership. In this battle, Maximilian risked his life to rescue Charles I de Croÿ from a perilous situation.

Benecke and Querengässer note that Maximilian incorporated Hussite war tactics, with the use of wagon forts, into the battle.

Results 
According to French historian Bertrand Schnerb, the battle was not decisive in determining the Burgundy war. Despite winning, Maximilian had to abandon the siege of Thérouanne and disband his army, either because the Netherlanders did not want him to become too strong or because his treasury was empty. Nevertheless, the victory confirmed the position of Maximilian as the protector of Burgundian heritance. The battle was a critical point in military history though: the Burgundian pikemen were the precursors of the Landsknechte, while the French side derived the momentum for military reform from their loss. According to Belgian historian Jelle Haemers, after Guinegate, the war against France was no longer defensive in nature, "but had instead become an offensive drive to recapture territory lost in 1477." The Estates in Flanders did not want to support Maximilian financially in this endeavour. Meanwhile, trying to avoid direct military confrontation again, Louis XI adopted a broader strategy in encouraging the Burgundian side's internal opponents, thus successfully forcing Maximilian to split his forces in different directions, abandon plans to recapture territories and search for new allies. The efforts of Maximilian and Margaret of York did lead to the break off between Edward IV and Louis XI.

After the battle, Maximilian began to recruit mercenaries and train them in a format taking inspiration from the Swiss model. From 1482, they gradually became known as the Landsknechte. Also, the fact that the Archduke fought together with the infantry in the first ranks during the battle (and thus obliging his nobles to do the same) was also considered revolutionary. The Landsknechte was not considered just a supporting arm, and an esprit-de-corps developed and distinguished them from other mercenaries.

In 1482, Maximilian was forced to cede Artois and Burgundy itself (except the County of Charolais) to Louis XI according to the Treaty of Arras, after Mary of Burgundy had died from a riding accident. The Habsburg side did not gain back the territories until the Treaty of Senlis (1493).

Notes

References

Bibliography

See also 
Battle of Guinegate (1513)

Guinegate (1479), Battle of
Guinegate (1479) Battle of
Guinegate 1479
1479 in Europe
1470s in France
Guinegate 1479
1470s in the Burgundian Netherlands
Maximilian I, Holy Roman Emperor